National Route 415 is a national highway of Japan connecting Hakui, Ishikawa and Toyama, Toyama in Japan, with a total length of 68.1 km (42.32 mi).

References

National highways in Japan
Roads in Ishikawa Prefecture
Roads in Toyama Prefecture